Doménica Michelle Azuero González (born 22 March 1996) is an Ecuadorian BMX rider. She competed in the time trial event at the 2015 UCI BMX World Championships. She also competed in the women's race at the 2020 Summer Olympics.

Notes

References

External links

 
 
 
 
 
 Domenica Azuero at dewielersite.net 
 http://www.zimbio.com/photos/Domenica+Michelle+Azuero+Gonzalez/Summer+Youth+Olympic+Games+Day+3/T0x7JJou7mk
 http://www.elcomercio.com/deportes/ecuador-y-domenica-azuero-cuspide.html

1996 births
Living people
BMX riders
Ecuadorian female cyclists
Olympic cyclists of Ecuador
Cyclists at the 2014 Summer Youth Olympics
Cyclists at the 2020 Summer Olympics
Pan American Games medalists in cycling
Pan American Games silver medalists for Ecuador
Cyclists at the 2015 Pan American Games
Cyclists at the 2019 Pan American Games
Medalists at the 2015 Pan American Games
21st-century Ecuadorian women